Lallukka is a Finnish surname. Notable people with the surname include:

Juha Lallukka (born 1979), Finnish cross country skier 
Juho Lallukka (1852–1913), Finnish businessman and patron of the arts
Piia Lallukka (born 1985), Finnish ice hockey player

Finnish-language surnames